The 2017–18 Ligue 1 season is the 48th edition (since independence) of the top level of football competition in Niger. It began on 22 December 2017 and ended on 12 August 2018.

Standings
Final table.

See also
2018 Niger Cup

References

Super Ligue (Niger) seasons
Premier League
Premier League
Niger